KUAA-LP (99.9 FM, "KUAA") is a radio station licensed to serve the community of Salt Lake City, Utah. The station is owned by Utah Arts Alliance and airs a World Ethnic format.

The station was assigned the KUAA-LP call letters by the Federal Communications Commission on July 9, 2015.

References

External links
 Official Website
 FCC Public Inspection File for KUAA-LP
 

UAA-LP
UAA-LP
Radio stations established in 2017
2017 establishments in Utah
World music radio stations
Salt Lake County, Utah